The U.S. Census Bureau lists fourteen metropolitan areas (Metropolitan Statistical Areas) and four trading areas (Combined Statistical Areas) in the U.S. state of Georgia. The tables below include the Census Bureau's most recent populations (2020 Census; released August 12, 2021).

See also
Table of United States Metropolitan Statistical Areas
Table of United States Combined Statistical Areas
Georgia statistical areas

References

 
Georgia